The Chairman of the Tambov Oblast Duma is the presiding officer of that legislature.

Office-holders

References 

Lists of legislative speakers in Russia
Politics of Tambov Oblast